Olli Benjamin Kaila (24 February 1918 Helsinki – 23 April 2014 Helsinki) was a Finnish diplomat, lawyer and banker. Kaila served as ambassador in Copenhagen, 1959-1961 and the Finnish Permanent Mission of the United Nations in Geneva 1961–1962. He was a member of the Board of Directors of the National Bank 1962-1983 and Vice-President of the General Director since 1975.

Kaila graduated in 1943 as a lawyer and earned the rank of Master of Law in 1946.

His father was Eino Kaila.

References 

Lawyers from Helsinki
Finnish bankers
1918 births
2014 deaths
Ambassadors of Finland to Denmark
Diplomats from Helsinki
Permanent Representatives of Finland to the United Nations